Francisco Rodón (June 6, 1934 – March 18, 2023) was a Puerto Rican portrait and landscape painter.

Born in San Sebastian, Puerto Rico, Rodón studied in Mexico, France, and Spain. He was named Puerto Rico's most important 20th century painter at the Expo 92 World's Fair in Seville, Spain, joining the 18th century's José Campeche and the 19th century's Francisco Oller.

Known for his portraits of major cultural figures, such as Argentinian author Jorge Luis Borges, Puerto Rican governor Luis Muñoz Marín, Cuban dancer Alicia Alonso, and Perú's Nobel laureate Mario Vargas Llosa. Rodón also painted a double portrait of Puerto Rican poet Giannina Braschi as a child sitting next to her mother.

The value of his works has exceeded that of other living Puerto Ricans in auctions held between 1990 and 2009.  Retrato de Medea sold for $93,000 in 1990. In 2009, his most recent oil on canvas, Puedo Retornar al Crepúsculo y la Noche sold for US $302,500 at Sotheby's, the highest price paid to that date for a Puerto Rican painting. His painting of Muñoz Marín is valued at 1 million dollars.

Rodon died in his sleep on March 18, 2023 in his home in San Juan, Puerto Rico.

Major works

Naturaleza Muerta con Aguacate
last sold on May 30, 2007, 118x87cm oil on canvas painted in 1962
Portrait of Jimmy
last sold on November 17, 2005, 91x72cm oil on panel painted in 1961
Borges o El Aleph
last sold on June 10, 2004, 306x142cm huile/toile painted c.1975
Inés en mis Sueños
last sold on May 28, 2002, 221-165 oil on canvas painted between 1996 and 2002
Juan Rulfo o Pedro Páramo
last sold on November 23, 1999, 287x211cm oil on canvas painted between 1981 and 1983
Vendedor de Solandras
last sold on November 22, 1999, 155x203cm oil on canvas painted between 1991 and 1993
Retrato de Medea
last sold for $93,000 on May 1, 1990, 183x127cm oil on canvas painted between 1969 and 1971

Portrait of Luis Muñoz Marín
The painting is part of the Luis Muñoz Marín Foundation's permanent collection.
Alicia Alonso

Mario Vargas Llosa

References

External links
Francisco Rodón website on archive.org
https://web.archive.org/web/20071020125235/http://www.allbiographies.com/biography-FranciscoRodon-55732.html
https://web.archive.org/web/20070930013138/http://web.artprice.com/ps/artitems.aspx?view=all&idarti=NzExODMyMzg0MDU4NTct&refGenre=A&page=1

1934 births
2023 deaths
People from San Sebastián, Puerto Rico
Puerto Rican painters
Art Students League of New York alumni